Melodrom is Melodrom's debut album and was released in February 2004 by Nika Records. It was chosen for the album of the year 2004 by Polet and Vikend magazines and the Videospotnice TV music show. In 2005 the album was re-released in an English version by Mascom Records.

Track listing
 "La ville"  – 2:49
 "Zasebne sobe"  – 4:02
 " – 5:15"  – 4:21
 "Duet"  – 3:32
 "Keep On"  – 4:10
 "Prenzlauer Allee"  – 3:56
 "September"  – 4:49
 "Ne iščeva konca"  – 5:48
 "Material talk"  – 3:37
 "Predstava"  – 5:30
 "La ville remix"  – 3:08

 All songs written, performed and arranged by Melodrom.

Personnel
Melodrom are:
Mina Špiler, vocals 
Matevž Grad, guitar, programming
Miha Žargi, bass
Matej Nolda, drums 
Polona Janežič, keyboards
Additional musicians:
Jaka Jarc, vocals: "Duet"
Igor Matkovič, trumpet: "5:15"
Judita Popovič, cello: "Zasebne sobe" and "Keep On"
Jelena Ždrale, violin and viola: "Zasebne sobe" and "Material Talk"
Trio Godalika: La ville remix
Produced by Jaka Jarc at Studio Hymnos, Ljubljana and Iztok Turk at Studio NSK, Ljubljana
Mastering by Iztok Turk at Studio NSK, Ljubljana
Design by Melodrom
Label: Nika Records

2004 albums
Albums recorded in Slovenia